The 2014 Varsity Cup was contested from 3 February to 7 April 2014. The tournament (also known as the FNB Varsity Cup presented by Steinhoff International for sponsorship reasons) was the seventh season of the Varsity Cup, an annual inter-university rugby union competition featuring eight South African universities.

Rules

The Varsity Cup used a different scoring system to the regular system. Tries were worth five points as usual, but conversions were worth three points, while penalties and drop goals were only worth two points.

All Varsity Cup games also had two referees officiating each game, props' jerseys featured a special gripping patch to ensure better binding, intended to reduce collapsing scrums and the mark will be extended to the entire field.

Competition

There were eight participating universities in the 2014 Varsity Cup. These teams played each other once over the course of the season, either home or away.

Teams received four points for a win and two points for a draw. Bonus points were awarded to teams that scored four or more tries in a game, as well as to teams that lost a match by seven points or less. Teams were ranked by log points, then points difference (points scored less points conceded).

The top four teams qualified for the title play-offs. In the semi-finals, the team that finished first had home advantage against the team that finished fourth, while the team that finished second had home advantage against the team that finished third. The winners of these semi-finals played each other in the final, at the home venue of the higher-placed team.

The bottom team in the Varsity Cup was relegated to the 2015 Varsity Shield competition, while the Varsity Shield winner was promoted to the 2015 Varsity Cup. There was also a promotion/relegation match between the 7th-placed team in the Varsity Cup and the Varsity Shield runner-up at the end of the 2014 season.

Teams

The following teams took part in the 2014 Varsity Cup competition:

Standings

The final league standings for the 2014 Varsity Cup were:

Round-by-round

Fixtures and results

The 2014 Varsity Cup fixtures were as follows:

 All times are South African (GMT+2).

Round one

Round two

Round three

Round four

Round five

Round six

Round seven

Semi-finals

Final

Players

Player statistics

The following table contain points which have been scored in competitive games in the 2014 Varsity Cup:

Squad lists

The teams released the following squad lists:

Forwards

 Wesley Adonis
 Justin Benn
 Lungelo Chonco
 Tertius Daniller
 Jan de Klerk
 Beyers de Villiers
 Charl de Villiers
 Renier Ehlers
 Neethling Gericke
 Ian Groenewald
 Liam Hendricks
 Nicol Heyns
 Frederick Kirsten
 Boeta Kleinhans
 Helmut Lehmann
 Koos Loubser
 Niel Oelofse
 Brendan Pitzer
 Jurg Streicher
 Wilhelm van der Sluys
 Did not play:
 Brianton Booysen
 Keith Chenoweth
 Tebogo Letlape
 Derick Linde
 Teunis Nieuwoudt
 Grant Prior
 Mark Prior
 Alistair Vermaak
Backs

 Craig Barry
 Bjorn Bernardo
 Robert du Preez
 JW Dürr
 Mark Hodgkiss
 Gerhard Jordaan
 Louis Jordaan
 Clearance Khumalo
 Johnny Kôtze
 Jean Nel
 Louis Nel
 Caleb Smith
 Chris Smith
 Did not play:
 Brandon Asher-Wood
 Ryno Eksteen
 Janco Gunter
 JP Lewis
 Warren Seals
tbc

 Jacobus de Kock
 Lars Esdar
 Dirk Kotzé
Coach

 Chris Rossouw

Forwards

 Tim Agaba
 André Barnard
 Greg Bauer
 Chris Cloete
 Wade Elliot
 Dexter Fahey
 Martin Ferreira
 Louis Fourie
 Roy Godfrey
 Marcel Groenewald
 Simon Kerrod
 Cameron Lindsay
 Enoch Mnyaka
 Jody Reyneke
 Nic Roebeck
 Stefan Willemse
 Did not play:
 Laurence Christie
 Hannes Huisamen
 Rob Louw
 Marzuq Maarman
 Lumko Mbane
 Arrie van der Berg
 Kewan Voysey
 Stephan Zaayman
Backs

 Enrico Acker
 Tythan Adams
 Michael Bernardt
 Fanie Booysen
 Jarryd Buys
 Aya Dlepu
 Gavin Hauptfleisch
 Andile Jho
 Devon Lailvaux
 Ivan Ludick
 Sinakho Mafu
 Donovan Marais
 Yamkela Ngam
 Matt Tweddle
 Kayle van Zyl
 Did not play:
 Ruan Allerston
 Steven Hansel
 Dwayne Kelly
 Sphu Msutwana
 Juan Smit
 Billy van Lill
 Justin van Staden
Coach

 David Maidza

Forwards

 Jaco Buys
 Stompie de Wet
 Marius Fourie
 John-Roy Jenkinson
 Danie Jordaan
 Robey Labuschagné
 Juan Language
 Mash Mafela
 Lucky Ngcamu
 Francois Robertse
 Joe Smith
 HP Swart
 Akker van der Merwe
 Peet van der Walt
 Elardus Venter
 Jacques Vermaak
 Rhyk Welgemoed
 Did not play:
 Wian Fourie
 Anton Krynauw
 SJ Niemand
 Siya November
 Marno Redelinghuys
 Ettienne Smith
Backs

 Lucian Cupido
 Johan Deysel
 Tiaan Dorfling
 Adriaan Engelbrecht
 Sylvian Mahuza
 Edmar Marais
 Hoffmann Maritz
 Akhona Nela
 Luther Obi
 Jaap Pienaar
 Dillon Smit
 Rhyno Smith
 Johnny Welthagen
 Did not play:
 Rowayne Beukman
 Warren Gilbert
 Lloyd Greeff
 Gerhard Nortier
 SW Oosthuizen
 Sarel Smith
 Marnus Tack
 Juandré Williams
 Percy Williams
Coach

 Robert du Preez

Forwards

 Guy Alexander
 Mike Botha
 Joel Carew
 Vince Jobo
 James Kilroe
 Jason Klaasen
 Kyle Kriel
 David Maasch
 Shaun McDonald
 Robin Murray
 Neil Rautenbach
 Chad Solomon
 Jan Uys
 Digby Webb
 Tino Zakeyo
 Msizi Zondi
 Did not play:
 Brad Bosman
 Deacon Chowles
 Gareth Ehret
 Keegan Ehret
 Zolani Faku
 Sean Johnstone
 Mike Kennedy
 Jade Kriel
 Sihle Mtwa
 Wade Schoor
Backs

 James Alexander
 Suwi Chibale
 Dean Grant
 Nick Holton
 Huw Jones
 Ross Jones-Davies
 Nate Nel
 Martin Sauls
 Guy Schwikkard
 Liam Slatem
 Richard Stewart
 Dave Strachan
 Lihleli Xoli
 Did not play:
 Tom Bednall
 Paul Cohen
 Ryan Dugmore
 Paul Hendry
 Trent Jenkinson
 Brendan Rodgers
Coach

 Kevin Musikanth

Forwards

 Dolph Botha
 Gideon Bruwer
 Tienie Burger
 Neil Claassen
 Luan de Bruin
 Jacques du Toit
 Elandré Huggett
 Niell Jordaan
 Armandt Koster
 Oupa Mohojé
 Sihle Ngxabi
 Markus Odendaal
 Gerhard Olivier
 Justin Pappin
 Nick Schonert
 Joe van der Hoogt
 Vaatjie van der Merwe
 Fanie van der Walt
 Henco Venter
 Did not play:
 Marco Klopper
Backs

 AJ Coertzen
 Pieter-Steyn de Wet
 Maphutha Dolo
 Franna du Toit
 Joubert Engelbrecht
 Ludwig Erasmus
 Kay-Kay Hlongwane
 Tertius Kruger
 Kevin Luiters
 Gouws Prinsloo
 Divandré Strydom
 Sethu Tom
 Vink van der Walt
 Robbie van Schalkwyk
 Did not play:
 Marco Mason
 Zee Mkhabela
 Don Mlondobozi
 Francois Pretorius
 Arthur Williams
Coach

 Michael Horak

Forwards

 David Antonites
 Fabian Booysen
 Van Zyl Botha
 Henna Bredenkamp
 François du Toit
 Jeremy Jordaan
 Wiseman Kamanga
 Shane Kirkwood
 Tiaan Macdonald
 Devon Marthinus
 Dylan Peterson
 Ryan Plasket
 Kobus Porter
 Mark Pretorius
 Victor Sekekete
 Jannes Snyman
 JP Swanepoel
 Rynhardt van Wyk
 Did not play:
 Phanta Qinisile
 Ramon Samuels
 Lodewyk Uys
Backs

 Robert de Bruyn
 JR Esterhuizen
 Michael Haznar
 Jaun Kotzé
 Pieter Morton
 Jacques Nel
 Andries Oosthuizen                               
 Jacques Pretorius
 Marais Schmidt
 Jaco van der Walt
 Vian van der Watt
 Lukas van Zyl
 Harold Vorster
 PJ Walters
 Did not play:
 Kallie Erasmus
 Selom Gavor
 Adrian Vermeulen
Coach

 Skollie Janse van Rensburg

Forwards

 Brummer Badenhorst
 Andrew Beerwinkel
 Leneve Damens
 Corniel Els
 Neethling Fouché
 Irné Herbst
 Reniel Hugo
 Jono Janse van Rensburg
 Jannes Kirsten
 Wiaan Liebenberg
 Chris Massyn
 Juan Schoeman
 Basil Short
 Roelof Smit
 Rudolph Smith
 Sidney Tobias
 Arno van Wyk
 Jaco Visagie
 Dennis Visser
 Did not play:
 Jarrett Crouch
 Christiaan de Bruin
 Pierre Schoeman
Backs

 Carlo Engelbrecht
 Warrick Gelant
 Rohan Janse van Rensburg
 Kefentse Mahlo
 Duncan Matthews
 Ryan Nell
 Burger Odendaal
 Jacques Rossouw
 Tian Schoeman
 Jade Stighling
 Dries Swanepoel
 Emile Temperman
 Francois Tredoux
 Did not play:
 Enver Brandt
 Riaan Britz
 Kobus Marais
 Clinton Swart
 André Warner
Coach

 Pote Human

Forwards

 Rinus Bothma
 JJ Breet
 Conor Brockschmidt
 Senna Esterhuizen
 Jason Fraser
 JP Jonck
 Ferdinand Kelly
 Ashley Kohler
 Hannes Ludick
 James Marx
 Thato Mavundla
 Devin Montgomery
 Gideon Muller
 Rendani Ramovha
 Pieter van Biljon
 Kyle Wood
 Did not play:
 KK Kgame
 Max Mhamhe
 Luvuyo Pupuma
 Cameron Shafto
 Phaka Zuma
Backs

 Riaan Arends
 Brent Crossley
 Ashlon Davids
 Mandla Dube
 Jacques Erasmus
 Divan Ferguson
 Nkuli Gamede
 Joshua Jarvis
 Ruhan Nel
 Wilton Pietersen
 Matt Torrance
 Did not play:
 Alistair Ballantyne
 Greg Blom
 Ryno Brits
 Kenneth du Plessis
 Grant Janke
 Jared Meyer
 Ish Nkolo
 Lonwabo Semane
Coach

 Andy Royle

Referees

The following referees officiated matches in the 2014 Varsity Cup:

 Rodney Boneparte
 Ben Crouse
 Gerrie de Bruin
 Christie du Preez
 Daniel Fortuin
 Stephan Geldenhuys
 Quinton Immelman
 Cwengile Jadezweni
 Jaco Kotze
 Pro Legoete
 Eduan Nel
 Tahla Ntshakaza
 Francois Pretorius
 Jaco Pretorius
 Oregopotse Rametsi
 Rasta Rasivhenge
 Archie Sehlako
 Lourens van der Merwe
 Marius van der Westhuizen
 Jaco van Heerden

Honours

See also

 Varsity Cup
 2014 Varsity Rugby
 2014 Varsity Shield
 2014 SARU Community Cup
 2014 Vodacom Cup

References

External links
 
 

2014
2014 in South African rugby union
2014 rugby union tournaments for clubs